Love and Liberté is the sixth studio album by Gipsy Kings released in 1993. The album was released in different US and European versions. Apart from the song order, the difference is the exclusive track "La Quiero" on the European release and versions of songs "Escucha Me" and "Campaña".

Track listing

Certifications

References

External links
Love and Liberté at gipsykings.net

1993 albums
Columbia Records albums
Elektra/Musician albums
Gipsy Kings albums